The Millennial Asia is a multidisciplinary, refereed academic journal the provides a platform for discussion on multifaceted, multidisciplinary and interdisciplinary research on Asia, in order to understand its fast changing context as a growth pole of global economy.

The journal is published thrice a year by SAGE Publications (New Delhi) in collaboration with Association of Asia Scholars.

This journal is a member of the Committee on Publication Ethics (COPE).

Abstracting and indexing 
Millennial Asia: An International Journal of Asian Studies is abstracted and indexed in:
 Bibliography of Asian Studies (BAS)
 Clarivate Analytics: Emerging Sources Citation Index (ESCI)
 DeepDyve
 Dutch-KB
 EconLit
 Indian Citation Index (ICI)
 J-Gate
 OCLC
 Ohio
 Portico
 ProQuest: Sociological Abstracts
 ProQuest: Worldwide Political Science Abstracts
 Research Papers in Economics (RePEc)
 SCOPUS
 UGC-CARE (GROUP II)

External links 
 
 Homepage

References 

 http://publicationethics.org/members/millennial-asia=COPE

SAGE Publishing academic journals
Publications established in 2010
Economics journals
Development studies journals